Arlington Memorial High School is a rural high school (grades 6–12) in Arlington, Bennington County,  Vermont and part of the Arlington School District. In 2018, it had about 220 students and a faculty of 35 teachers.

In 2018 - 2nd Highest Academic Achieving High School in Vermont by U.S. News & World Report (silver medal)

In 2017 - Named a “Best High School in America” by U.S. News & World Report (silver medal)

The new Mack Performing Arts Center and Wes Carlson Studio for Dance and Theater is used by students and community members alike. Its 140-seat theatre, courtyard, and stage provide the venue for a variety of events.

History
In 1921, Arlington Memorial School was constructed. In 1922, students were then moved into the new Town high school. This was the first high school of the Town of Arlington, rather than the individual districts of Arlington. An 1892 legislation act of the Vermont Legislature required towns to address the means of education, rather than the districts of each town. The school was named in memorial to all of the Arlington Veterans of every war. Before Arlington Memorial school was constructed, students from each district school would have to take the train to North Bennington or Manchester in order to attend upper-level classes.

Arlington Memorial School fire 
On November 9, 1940, Arlington Memorial school burned down. The town was quick to assemble and addressed the disaster in two stages. The first stage was the short term, students would meet in family homes in order to graduate on time. While the second, long-term goal, was to build a new building on top of the old one. The old building was starting to get overcrowded and the fire could be considered a blessing and a curse.

Arlington athletics 
Arlington Memorial High School competes in the Marble Valley League Class D Division. They are also a Division 4 Vermont High School. The Boys Soccer Team currently competes in a Marble Valley League Class C schedule due to the dominance of the Class D league in past years. The Boys Overall record in 2017 was 8–5–1 as of April 4, 2018. They lost in the Quarter-Finals in 2017 to South Royalton of the Central Vermont League. The Girls Soccer team recently just won the Division 4 Vermont State Title. The Girls overall record in the 2017 season was 14–0 not including the playoff games. With the playoff games, the girls are 18–0, making a perfect, undefeated season. To the surprise of many, Arlington also has a relatively successful baseball team. In the 2021 season, the Varsity boys team posted a record of 11-2 in the regular season, winning the Marble Valley League. After winning a quarterfinal game against Rivendell Academy, they were eliminated from playoff contention in the semifinal round by Blue Mountain Union High School, finishing with a 12-3 overall record.

Arlington Athletics State Championships

Baseball State Championships 
 1989 Baseball Champions
 1990 Baseball Champions
 1995 Baseball Champions

Basketball State Championships 

 1971 Boys Basketball Champions
 1983 Boys Basketball Champions
 1984 Boys Basketball Champions
 1985 Boys Basketball Champions
 1989 Boys Basketball Champions
 1990 Girls Basketball Champions
 1991 Girls Basketball Champions
 1991 Boys Basketball Champions
 1992 Boys Basketball Champions
 1993 Girls Basketball Champions
 1998 Girls Basketball Champions
 1998 Boys Basketball Champions
 2000 Girls Basketball Champions
 2001 Girls Basketball Champions
 2003 Girls Basketball Champions
 2003 Boys Basketball Champions
 2004 Girls Basketball Champions
 2005 Girls Basketball Champions

Soccer State Championships 

 1982 Boys Soccer Champions
 1984 Boys Soccer Champions
 1985 Boys Soccer Champions
 1986 Boys Soccer Champions
 1989 Girls Soccer Champions
 1989 Boys Soccer Champions
 1990 Girls Soccer Champions
 1990 Boys Soccer Champions
 1991 Girls Soccer Champions
 1992 Girls Soccer Champions
 1995 Boys Soccer Champions
 2002 Girls Soccer Champions
 2009 Girls Soccer Champions
 2017 Girls Soccer Champions
 2018 Girls Soccer Champions
 2018 Boys Soccer Champions

Softball State Championships 

 1983 Softball Champions
 1984 Softball Champions
 1985 Softball Champions
 1986 Softball Champions
 1987 Softball Champions
 1989 Softball Champions
 1990 Softball Champions
 1993 Softball Champions
 1999 Softball Champions
 2001 Softball Champions

School awards 

2007 - Named a “Best High School in America” by U.S. News & World Report (silver medal)
2008 - Named a “Best High School in America” by U.S. News & World Report (bronze medal)
2009 -  AP Scores Above State & National Average
2009 - 5th Highest State Scores for NECAP Science
2009 - 3rd Highest State Scores for NECAP Reading & Writing
2009 - Named a "Top School" by The Johns Hopkins University
2010 - 3rd Highest Academic Achieving High School in Vermont
2013 - Named a “Best High School in America” by U.S. News & World Report (silver medal)
2016 - 4th Highest Academic Achieving High School in Vermont
2016 - Named a “Best High School in America” by U.S. News & World Report (silver medal)
2017 - Named a “Best High School in America” by U.S. News & World Report (silver medal)
2017 - 2nd Highest Academic Achieving High School in Vermont by U.S. News & World Report (silver medal)

References

Public high schools in Vermont
Public middle schools in Vermont
Buildings and structures in Arlington, Vermont
Schools in Bennington County, Vermont